The Southampton City Art Gallery is an art gallery in Southampton, southern England. It is located in the Civic Centre on Commercial Road.

The gallery opened in 1939 with much of the initial funding from the gallery coming from two bequests, one from Robert Chipperfield (1817–1911) and another from Frederick William Smith. The gallery was damaged during World War II and repairing this damaged delayed its reopening until 1946.

The gallery's art collection covers six centuries of European art history, with over 5,300 works in its fine art collection. It is housed in an example of 1930s municipal architecture. The gallery holds a Designated Collection, considered of national importance.

Highlights of the permanent collection include a 14th-century altarpiece by Allegretto Nuzi, of the Italian Giambattista Pittoni; the Perseus series by Burne-Jones; paintings by the Camden Town Group and The London Group; sculpture by Jacob Epstein, Auguste Rodin, Edgar Degas, Henri Gaudier Brzeska, Richard Deacon and Tony Cragg; and Richard Long photographs.

Changes to the Art Gallery  

In November 2012, it was announced that the gallery's opening times were likely to be significantly reduced, as part of Southampton City Council's drive to save £20 million. On 1 April 2013, the art gallery's opening times changed to the following times:
 Monday-Friday: 10am-3pm
 Saturday: 10am-5pm
 Sunday: Closed

References

External links 

 
 Southampton City Council: Museums

Government buildings completed in the 20th century
Art museums and galleries in Hampshire
Museums in Southampton
Buildings and structures in the United Kingdom destroyed during World War II
Art museums established in 1939
1939 establishments in England